Núria Vilarrubla García (born 9 March 1992) is a Spanish slalom canoeist who has competed at the international level since 2009.

She won three medals at the ICF Canoe Slalom World Championships with two silvers (C1 team: 2019, 2021) and a bronze (C1: 2015). She also won six medals (2 golds, 1 silver and 3 bronzes) at the European Championships.

Vilarrubla competed at the 2020 Summer Olympics in Tokyo, finishing 8th in the C1 event.

World Cup individual podiums

References

External links

Spanish female canoeists
Living people
1992 births
Medalists at the ICF Canoe Slalom World Championships
People from La Seu d'Urgell
Sportspeople from the Province of Lleida
Canoeists at the 2020 Summer Olympics
Olympic canoeists of Spain
21st-century Spanish women